Actual Life 3 (January 1 – September 9 2022) is the third album from British producer Fred Gibson under the stage name Fred Again. It was released on October 28, 2022, through Atlantic Records. Similar to the previous two releases in the Actual Life series, Actual Life 3 incorporates samples and audio clips from existing material, such as Instagram videos.

Critical reception

Actual Life 3 was released to positive critical reception. The album featured at 19th in Double Js 50 best albums of the year. It also featured on Billboards top 50 list, garnering 41st.

It was nominated for Album of the Year at the 2023 Brit Awards.

In the 2022 Triple J Hottest 100, two of the album's songs were featured in the countdown. "Delilah (Pull Me Out of This)" was 14th and "Danielle (Smile on My Face)" was 100th.

Track listing

Notes
 All track titles are stylised with parenthetical text in all lowercase. As an example, "Eyelar (Shutters)" is stylised "Eyelar (shutters)".
  signifies an additional producer.

Personnel
Musicians
 Fred Again – programming (1–5, 7, 8, 10–13), vocals (tracks 1, 6, 9, 13)
 Benjy Gibson – programming (2, 5, 8)
 Eyelar Mirzazadeh – vocals (2)
 Parisi – programming (4, 7–12), bass (7, 10), synthesizer (7, 9, 11), sound effects (10), drums (11), keyboards (11)
 Marco Parisi – bass (3), synthesizer (3, 8), programming (4), keyboards (5)
 Giampaolo Parisi – drums (3, 8), programming (3, 4, 8), sound effects (5), bass (7, 10), synthesizer (7, 9)
 Alex Gibson – programming (3)
 Kieran Hebden – programming (3), drum programming (8)
 Delilah Montagu – vocals (3, 10)
 Kamille – vocals (4, 10)
 Rob Milton – programming (5)
 Dermot Kennedy – vocals (5, 10)
 Jeremy Biddle – vocals (6)
 Kelly Zutrau – vocals (9)
 Clara Ward Singers – vocals (10, 11)
 Jamie xx – programming (12)
 Winnie Raeder – vocals (12)

Technical
 Jay Reynolds – mastering, mixing (1, 2, 4, 6, 9–13)
 Fred Again – mastering (3, 5), mixing (5, 6, 8)
 Kieran Hebden – mastering, mixing (8)
 Peter Fenn – vocal engineering (7)

Charts

Notes

References

2022 albums
Fred Again albums